Frankenthal is a German name which may refer to:

 Frankenthal, a city in Rhineland-Palatinate, Germany
 Frankenthal, Saxony, a municipality in Saxony, Germany
 Hans Frankenthal (1926-1999), Holocaust survivor
 Frankenthal (grape), another name for the German/Italian wine grape Trollinger